Thalia da Silva Costa (born 30 May 1997) is a Brazilian rugby union player.

Personal life
Her twin sister Thalita Costa also plays rugby sevens for Brazil.  They were born in São Luís.

Career
Costa was named in the Brazil squad for the Rugby sevens at the 2020 Summer Olympics. She represented Brazil at the 2022 Rugby World Cup Sevens in Cape Town, they placed eleventh overall.

References 

1997 births
Living people
Brazilian rugby union players
Olympic rugby sevens players of Brazil
Rugby sevens players at the 2020 Summer Olympics
Twin sportspeople
Brazilian twins
People from São Luís, Maranhão
Brazilian female rugby union players
Brazil international women's rugby sevens players
Brazilian rugby sevens players
Sportspeople from Maranhão